Monsignor Saro Wilfrido Vera Troche (October 6, 1922 – May 7, 2000) was a Christian priest from Paraguay. He was born on October 6, 1922, in Rosario Tatuy Caazapá Department Paraguay, into a peasant family which held profound faith in religion. He died in 2000, and courtesy of his career, it was widely believed that this was a man who left behind his intellectual legacy.

Childhood and youth 

Vera received his primary education in Caazapá but there was a two-year gap in his studies due to the Chaco War in 1935. He studied his first year of classic high school in the Metropolitan Seminary of Asuncion. At the age of thirteen, he joined the Metropolitan Seminary in Buenos Aires, where he studied philosophy and theology and earned his bachelor's degree. 

He was ordained a priest in the same seminary on November 28, 1948. He returned to Paraguay in 1950 and spent the year preparing for a bachelor's degree in theology.

First steps 

Having assumed his role in the hierarchy of the Catholic Church, Vera decided not to be a priest in the town of Villarrica, but to work among the poor that belonged to the parish of Buena Vista. Subsequently he lived there for many years. 

The archbishop of Asuncion, Felipe Santiago Benitez, who prefaced the book The Evangelization of the Paraguayan, defined him as a thinker of the Paraguayan church. "In my view, the higher quality of our times," he said. He added that "many of his claims could be discussed or, perhaps, were not acceptable, but deserve our respect and admiration."

Works 

Saro Vera wrote several books during his lifetime, but not all of them have been published. In his book The Evangelization of the Paraguayan, Vera proposed a scientific study of the Paraguayan Catholic living a Christian life. 

Another of his books is Six Stories of a Peasant. This book contains a prologue written by Helio Vera, who describes this collection of stories as a mixture of fiction and reality. The stories do not lose their testimonial character, as they are developed around the events involving the guerrillas which operated in the area where Saro Vera fulfilled his evangelical mission during the 1960s'. The prologue writers explain that perhaps this was his way of encouraging reflection and imparting education: "We drew the tortuous paths that our people had to go, pushed by the unstoppable dialectic of violence," said Vera. 

Other titles published by Vera include Stories of Paraguay Locals. But in his book "The Paraguayan, a man outside his world", where he clearly defines the three famous laws, namely the mbareté (the tough), ñembotavy (the indifferent) and vaivai (the in-between), the tales are not stories but ways in which Paraguayans think and behave. 

Saro Vera understood that "to know the national being, we need to discover the hidden reasons or deep motivations, immersed in the distance of time, in the subconscious and into unconsciousness." This material is of great significance for understanding Paraguayans. Here is part of his work -

"Kuimba`e Nahaséiva"(Men Do Not Cry) 
  
In Paraguay, a man should not cry even as a child. Not crying is a sign of something much broader than mere machismo. This attitude is related to his role. Men should refrain from showing their feelings, especially adverse emotions; they find it compelling to dominate pain and misfortune. The Paraguayan, even though his role is conducted outside the home, is the facilitator who provides the nurturing and protection. The man does not require feelings. First of all, you need strength, skill "ha'evé" ability and ingenuity, and a tendency to work. 

An anemic man will not be the breadwinner of the family or for anyone. What can be expected from a complaining man, who regrets a scratch? The man must master his feelings in general, and especially his feelings of pain and setbacks. 

This man, owner of himself and pain, cannot be formed if he is not educated and trained. Hence from childhood that man should not cry. When he cries, you hit him so he that can shut up and learn to master his pain and his tears. With this procedure he does not seek a machismo, but receives training for attaining a respectable countenance pertaining to his role as a man. We must strengthen the boy against pain. 

Neither should the girl unleash her expressions of grief. She also requires the self-control to survive in a world of frugality, deprivation and poorly cured diseases. We must help her prepare to deal with this.

Paraguay and common wealth 

This analysis corresponds to another fragment of the book by Saro Vera namely "The Paraguayan, a man outside his world": 

The Paraguayan, with his kind of culture, is not naturally inserted in the macro community. The nation exceeds his psychic ability of integration. His psychological place is in the mini community of the family. The common good of the family is the only thing he finds understandable, or interests to which all members are entitled in accordance with the scale of privileged positions in relation to kinship. 

Common wealth is the responsibility of the authority. The Paraguayan considers silly the one who is in the Government and has not taken the opportunity to enrich himself. This conviction of dishonesty in dealing with the public response would be purely intellectual and existential without any force. 

For the people, what we call dishonesty is taken for granted. What you should do is to ease its public intemperance with works showing that the national treasury is not going entirely into your pocket. "To'úna pero toyapó", to use but to do something. If you apply this condition, everything is going to go well. Another condition that clogs the evil of exploiting the common wealth is resorting to the excuse of involving others. "To'una, anínte ho'upaitereí ha'eño; to porokonvidamimi", meaning he who exploits common wealth should involve others in doing so, too.

"The Paraguayan and Freedom" 

This analysis is part of the book named "The Paraguayan, a man outside his world" of Saro Vera: 

The Paraguayan still maintains the concept of freedom of a tribal society. He is happy to be free internally. 
Any citizen can question the freedom of the Paraguayan. He, in turn, questions the freedom of the citizen who is manipulated by appearances, lies, false promises and the media, and has deposited the vote which apparently should be given to the winner.
 
Where the Paraguayan feels really free is in the use of time. Being the owner of time is a great freedom. If he happens to work, he works and if not, then he does not work. The days, hours and weeks are his, without Damocles’ sword hanging over his head. He should not apologize because he was late by kneeling for nearly five minutes.

"The Paraguayan and Power"

This religious man has also referred to power in his book titled "The Paraguayan, a man outside his world": 

Power is a serious temptation for the Paraguayan. Perhaps it is so for most of the world, but not for some. Through power man occupies a privileged place within society. It is a very remarkable change, the one that power produces in Paraguayans. He immediately assumes an attitude of life-forgiver and guardian. 

He is sensitive towards what he is considered the protector of. He would break his own soul not to disappoint the protected ones, because the protected ones will always be inferior to him. He will always require places of prominence, special considerations and honors. 

He must be at the head of any enterprise or organization, but do absolutely nothing. No one should count on him if he is relegated to a lower position or if someone appoints him as a subordinate. In this case he will do the impossible by boycotting the work to demonstrate that he is vital as head of the enterprise. Let's not talk of a chief supporter. This will assume all possible roles of a community. He will be mayor, judge and if allowed, would also be the parish priest. The problem with the Paraguayan power is misplacement. He is a chieftain in a civilized state. Paraguay is the country of friends. Ordinary people need this support because no rights protect them. 

He is bound to obligations and is also exposed to the whim of the man in power.

The Paraguayan and wealth 

Another element that the Paraguayan is totally scrambled with is wealth. Anyone who reaches a certain economic level suffers a change, so much so that it is difficult to recognize the person after a while. It's amazing, the change that transforms them with wealth in their hands. The "riko pyahu." (new rich) is an unrecognizable Paraguayan.

The Paraguayan and work 

Is the Paraguayan lazy or not? In this case there are irrational detractors who haven’t thought or don't want to know anything about defending the Paraguayan. The Paraguayan does not work as he should. He loses hours drinking terere. He never strives to the maximum. When a loan is granted, the money is invested on superfluous things and not on improving his farming area. 

The Paraguayan is a highly valued worker in any field outside Paraguay, because despite being semi literate, they become highly skilled workers. The ideal situation for the Paraguayan is to earn money without working or working with the least effort. So every time he can carry out paid work it will be "vaivaí suerte raicha" (in a bad way, for luck). However, when working for a friend and without payment, he does so thoroughly, not "vaivaí."(in a bad way).

The Paraguayan and love 

The best recommendation for a husband is to be a worker, because he gets to sustain the family. His pride is that their children are well looked after and he has an elegant wife. He is praised because of his "hembireko poti" (lit. clean wife).

In this cultural context love is almost functional. There is almost no place for romance and affection. These connotations of love are almost reduced to times of courtship. On the other hand, the Paraguayan man is extremely sensitive to affection. But these roles often deviate and consume time that would be devoted to emotional expressions. Besides, too much demonstration overwhelms both male and female Paraguayans. 

When the woman is too clingy, the man is annoyed. He can stand up to a certain extent, and passing that measure, he feels upset. He is neither very supportive to demonstrations of love in public. Love belongs to the world of privacy. Paraguayans are little demonstrative of their feelings of grief or joy, love or hatred, all of which are almost always reduced to very measured gestures and actions. They spare no words. 

The Paraguayan is noble. A feature of nobility is his inability to take revenge.

References  

1922 births
2000 deaths
Paraguayan religious leaders